Donte  is a given name. Notable people with the given name include:

Donté Clark (born 1977), American poet
Donté Forbes (born 2005) Jamaican football player
Donté Curry (born 1978), American football player
Donte Foster (born 1990), American football player
Donte Gamble (born 1978), American football player
Donté Greene (born 1988), American basketball player
Donte Jackson (American football) (born 1995), American football player
Donte Moncrief (born 1993), American football player
Donte Nicholson (born 1981), American football player
Donte Paige-Moss (born 1991), American football player
Donté Stallworth (born 1980), American football player
Donte Whitner (born 1985), American football player
Donte Williams (born 1982), American football coach

Fictional characters
Donté Drumm, The Confession
 The rebooted version of Dante from the Devil May Cry series that featured in DmC: Devil May Cry.

Places
Donte’s - a defunct jazz club in Los Angeles

See also
Live at Donte's (disambiguation)
Dante (name)
Dontae, given name